The Trade Disputes and Trade Unions Act 1927 (17 and 18 Geo V c 22) was a British Act of Parliament passed in response to the General Strike of 1926, introduced by the Attorney General for England and Wales, Sir Douglas Hogg MP.

Provisions

Restrictions on strike action
The Act declared unlawful secondary action and any strike whose purpose was to coerce the government of the day directly or indirectly. These provisions were declaratory insofar as such strikes had already been ruled unlawful by Astbury, J in the National Sailors' and Firemen's Union v Reed. The Act reaffirmed his judgment and gave it the force of statute law. In addition, incitement to participate in an unlawful strike was made a criminal offence, punishable by imprisonment for up to two years; and the attorney general was empowered to sequester the assets and funds of unions involved in such strikes.

Intimidation
Section 3 of the Act declared unlawful mass picketing which gave rise to the intimidation of a worker.

Political levy
Section 4 of the Act mandated trade union members to contract-in to any political levy which their union made on their behalf. This resulted in an 18% fall in the income of the Labour Party, which was heavily reliant upon union funding.

Civil service unions
Section 5 of the Act enjoined civil service unions from affiliation to the TUC and forbade them from having political objectives.

Repeal
The Act was particularly resented by the trade union movement and the Labour Party. Indeed, one Labour MP described it as "a vindictive Act, and one of the most spiteful measures that was ever placed upon the Statute Book". The second minority Labour government introduced a bill to repeal various provisions of the Act in 1931 which was not passed. The Act was eventually repealed by section 1 of the Trade Disputes and Trade Unions Act 1946.

After the election of Margaret Thatcher, the Conservative Party reintroduced their ban on secondary action, first with restrictions in the Employment Act 1980 and finally banning it altogether in the Employment Act 1990. This is now codified in the Trade Union and Labour Relations (Consolidation) Act 1992.

See also
UK labour law
Amalgamated Society of Railway Servants v Osborne [1910] AC 87
Trade Union Act 1913
Trade Disputes and Trade Unions Act 1946
TULRCA 1992 s 82

Notes

United Kingdom Acts of Parliament 1927
Trade union legislation
1927 in labor relations
United Kingdom labour law